Kolokol Group is a group of somma volcanoes located in the central part of Urup Island, Kuril Islands, Russia. The group is named after its highest volcano but also includes volcanoes called Berg, Trezubetz (which erupted in 1924) and Borzov. The most active in the group is Berg, while Borzov is the oldest.

See also
 List of volcanoes in Russia

References 
 

Urup
Active volcanoes
Volcanoes of the Kuril Islands